Kanamarí, or Katukina-Kanamari, is a Katukinan language spoken by about 650 individuals in Amazonas, Brazil.  It is considered endangered.

The two principal varieties, Kanamari (Canamarí) and Katukina (Catuquina), are mutually intelligible, and have both been confused with neighboring languages with the same or similar names.

Synonyms and dialect names include Tshom-djapa, Tsohon-djapa, Wiri-dyapá, Pidá-dyapá, Kutiá-dyapá (Kadiu-diapa, Cutiadapa), Tucun-diapa, Bendiapa, Parawa.

Etymology
The term Katukina is derived from the Proto-Purus term *ka-tukanɨ, meaning ‘speaker of an indigenous language’. As a result, it is used to refer to a few different unrelated languages belonging to separate language families, including Panoan and Arawakan:

Katukina (Arawakan)
Katukína (Panoan)
Catuquinarú (unclassified)

Phonology

Consonants 

An alveolar lateral consonant /l/ may be realized as a retroflex lateral . A velar nasal  sound is often heard when following after nasal vowels. A glottal stop  can be heard before word-initial vowels. A word-final /k/ may also sound unreleased .

Vowels 

Grammar
The syntax of Kanamarí is characterized by ergative–absolutive alignment. The absolutive argument (i.e. the subject of intransitive verbs and the object of transitive verbs) is unmarked for case, and usually appears following the verb phrase.

If the absolutive argument is a pronoun, it is represented by its free-standing form.

The ergative argument (i.e. the agent of transitive verbs) is marked for genitive case. If the agent is a pronoun, it is represented by a genitive prefix (as in no-ti paiko 'you killed grandfather' above). If the agent is a full noun, it is linked to the verb with the case marker na, which phonologically attaches to the verb:

References

Queixalós, Francesc 2012. The Katukina-Kanamari antipassive. In: Gilles Authier and Katharina Haude (eds). Ergativity, Valency and Voice. Berlin: De Gruyter Mouton. (pp. 227–258)

External links
Catuquina (Intercontinental Dictionary Series)

Languages of Brazil
Katukinan languages
Indigenous languages of Western Amazonia